FC Norchi Dinamoeli is a Georgian football club based in Tbilisi. They play in Erovnuli Liga 2 since they were promoted in 2017.

History
Football School Norchi Dinamoeli was organized by FC Dinamo Tbilisi in 1949, The School primary purpose was to prepare young talented players for the club. FC Norchi Dinamoeli became the winner of the Pirveli Liga in 1999 and promoted to Umaglesi Liga, where he participated in club FC Tbilisi behalf. First season at the club was relegated from a Umaglesi Liga. The following season the Club joined to FC Merani-91 Tbilisi and participating as a Norchi Dinamo Merani-B. In 2002, FC Merani has faced financial problems due to the collapse of the team and relegated From the Umaglesi Liga. Since 2003, FC Norchi Dinamoeli played in the Meore Liga, the team won Meore Liga in 2006 and took the lead in the Pirveli Liga. The club competes in the Pirveli Liga.

Seasons
{|class="wikitable"
|-bgcolor="#efefef"
! Season
! League
! Pos.
! Pl.
! W
! D
! L
! GF
! GA
! P
! Cup
! Notes
! Manager
|-
|1995–96
|bgcolor=#ffa07a|Pirveli Liga
|align=right bgcolor=silver|2
|align=right|36||align=right|26||align=right|3||align=right|7
|align=right|99||align=right|27||align=right|81
|Not Played
|
|
|-
|1996–97
|bgcolor=#ffa07a|Pirveli Liga, East Group
|bgcolor=cc9966 align=right|5 
|align=right|38||align=right|20||align=right|10||align=right|8
|align=right|95||align=right|33||align=right|70
|Not Played
|
|
|-
|1998–99
|bgcolor=#ffa07a|Pirveli Liga, East, B zone
|bgcolor=gold align=right|1 
|align=right|26||align=right|24||align=right|0||align=right|2
|align=right|79||align=right|17||align=right|72
|Not Played
|Promoted
|
|-
|1999-00
|Umaglesi Liga
|align=right|14
|align=right|14||align=right|3||align=right|2||align=right|9
|align=right|12||align=right|26||align=right|25
|Round of 8
|Relegated
|
|-
|2001–02
|bgcolor=#ffa07a|Pirveli Liga
|bgcolor=cc9966 align=right|11 
|align=right|22||align=right|5||align=right|1||align=right|16
|align=right|17||align=right|47||align=right|16
|Not Played
|Relegated
|
|-
|2005–06
|bgcolor=#98bb98|Meore Liga East.
|bgcolor=gold align=right|1 
|align=right|30||align=right|22||align=right|6||align=right|2
|align=right|82||align=right|12||align=right|72
|Not Played
|Promoted
|
|-
|2006–07
|bgcolor=#ffa07a|Pirveli Liga
|bgcolor=cc9966 align=right|8 
|align=right|34||align=right|16||align=right|4||align=right|14
|align=right|50||align=right|49||align=right|52
|Round of 16
|
|
|-
|2007–08
|bgcolor=#ffa07a|Pirveli Liga
|bgcolor=cc9966 align=right|10 
|align=right|27||align=right|1||align=right|7||align=right|19
|align=right|20||align=right|70||align=right|10
|Round of 16
|
|
|-
|2008–09
|bgcolor=#ffa07a|Pirveli Liga
|bgcolor=cc9966 align=right|10 
|align=right|30||align=right|3||align=right|7||align=right|20
|align=right|28||align=right|72||align=right|16
|Round of 32
|
|
|-
|2009–10
|bgcolor=#ffa07a|Pirveli Liga
|bgcolor=cc9966 align=right|8 
|align=right|28||align=right|9||align=right|5||align=right|14
|align=right|38||align=right|57||align=right|32
|Round of 32
|
|Valeri Gagua
|-
|2010–11
| bgcolor=#ffa07a|Pirveli Liga
|bgcolor=cc9966 align=right|10
|align=right|32||align=right|10||align=right|5||align=right|17
|align=right|39||align=right|58||align=right|35
|Round of 32
|
|Valeri Gagua
|-
|2011–12
| bgcolor=#ffa07a|Pirveli Liga
|bgcolor=gold align=right|1
|align=right|19||align=right|14||align=right|7||align=right|4
|align=right|48||align=right|28||align=right|44
|Round of 32
|
|Zorbeg Ebralidze
|-
|2012–13
| bgcolor=#ffa07a|Pirveli Liga
|align=right|  
|align=right| ||align=right| ||align=right| ||align=right| 
|align=right| ||align=right| ||align=right| 
|
|
|
|-
|2018
| bgcolor=#ffa07a|Pirveli Liga
|align=right|4
|align=right|36||align=right|14||align=right|9||align=right|13
|align=right|54||align=right|47||align=right|51
|Third round
|
|
|}

Current squad

Honors 
 Pirveli Liga
Champion 1998–99
Second place 1995–96
 Meore Liga
Champion 1994–1995 (East Zone)
Champion 1996–1997 (East Zone) (Norchi Dinamoeli-2)
Champion 1998–1999 (East Zone) (Norchi Dinamoeli-2)
Champion 2002–2003 (East Zone)
Champion 2005–2006 (East Zone)

External links
 Soccerway

 
Norchi Dinamo Tbilisi
Association football clubs established in 1999
Norchi Dinamo Tbilisi
1999 establishments in Georgia (country)